Tungsten (Cantung) Airport  serves the Cantung Mine and is located near Tungsten, Northwest Territories, Canada. Prior permission is required to land except in the case of an emergency.

References

External links

Registered aerodromes in the Dehcho Region